Kenneth G. DeGraaf is a state representative from Colorado Springs, Colorado. A Republican, DeGraaf represents Colorado House of Representatives District 22, which includes a portion of northeast Colorado Springs in El Paso County.

Background
DeGraaf is a 30-year veteran of the United States Air Force. Now he works as a commercial airline pilot and lives in Colorado Springs. He studied engineering mechanics at the United States Air Force Academy and later earned a masters degree in the same field from Columbia University, where he was awarded a Guggenheim fellowship.

Elections
In the 2022 Colorado House of Representatives election, DeGraaf defeated his Democratic Party and Libertarian Party opponents, winning 57.66% of the total votes cast.

References

External links
 Legislative website
 Campaign website

21st-century American politicians
Living people
Politicians from Colorado Springs, Colorado
Year of birth missing (living people)
United States Air Force Academy alumni
Columbia University alumni
Commercial aviators
Aviators from Colorado
Republican Party members of the Colorado House of Representatives